Repentigny station is a commuter rail station operated by Exo in Repentigny, Quebec, Canada, a suburb north of Montreal. 

It is served by the Mascouche line. 

The station possesses a single side platform, although two rails pass through it; the second is used for non-stopping main line traffic. The platform is a high-level platform, a feature shared only with Gare Centrale, Terrebonne, and Mascouche stations on the commuter train network. 

The platform runs along Rue Ricard, underneath a viaduct carrying Quebec Autoroute 40. There are three exits. A short staircase exits from the south end of the platform onto Rue Ricard; a walkway passes from the north end of the platform under Boul. Pierre-Le Gardeur to a small parking lot on Place des Roseaux; and the main parking lot and bus loop are located on the east side of the tracks on Boulevard Lacombe.

The station features an enclosed overhead bridge passing over the tracks to the main parking lot, with stair and elevator access. As a result, the station is wheelchair-accessible. The east side of the structure features an artwork by Nicolas Baier, L'Arbre de la gare.

Bus Connections

MRC de L'Assomption (MRCLASSO)

References

External links
 Repentigny Commuter Train Station Information (RTM)
 Repentigny Commuter Train Station Schedule (RTM)

Exo commuter rail stations
Transport in Repentigny, Quebec
Railway stations in Lanaudière
Railway stations in Quebec